National Route 365 is a national highway of Japan connecting Kaga, Ishikawa and Yokkaichi, Mie in Japan, with a total length of 229.4 km (142.54 mi).

References

National highways in Japan
Roads in Fukui Prefecture
Roads in Gifu Prefecture
Roads in Ishikawa Prefecture
Roads in Mie Prefecture
Roads in Shiga Prefecture